Toba Tek Singh District (Punjabi and ) is a district of Faisalabad Division in the Punjab province of Pakistan. It is located between 30°33' to 31°2' Degree north latitudes and 72°08' to 72°48' Degree longitudes. It became a separate district in 1982.

Etymology
The city and district is named after a Sikh religious figure Tek Singh. Legend has it that Tek Singh, a kind-hearted man served water and provided shelter to the worn out and thirsty travelers passing by a small pond ("TOBA" in Punjabi) which eventually was called Toba Tek Singh, and the surrounding settlement acquired the same name. There is also a park here named after Tek Singh.

British Raj
Toba Tek Singh was developed by the British toward the end of the 19th Century when a canal system was built. People from all over the Punjab (currently Indian and Pakistani Punjab) moved there as farmlands were allotted to them. Most of the people who migrated there belonged to Lahore, Jalandhar, Hoshiarpur districts.
The Imperial Gazetteer of India described the tehsil of Toba Tek Singh as follows:

The population in 1906 was 148,984. It contains 342 villages, including Toba Tek Singh (population, 1,874), the headquarters, and Gojra (2,589), an important grain market on the Wazirabad-Khanewal branch of the North-Western Railway. The land revenue in 1905-6 amounted to Rupees 470,000. The tehsil consists of a level plain, wholly irrigated by the Chenab Canal. The soil, which is very fertile in the east of the tehsil, becomes sandy towards the west. The boundaries of the tehsil were somewhat modified at the time of the formation of the new District of Faisalabad (formerly called Lyallpur). 

The predominantly Muslim population supported Muslim League and Pakistan Movement.  After the independence of Pakistan in 1947, the minority Hindus and Sikhs migrated to India while the Muslim refugees from India settled in the Toba Tek Singh District.

After independence
During the 1970s, when many Pakistani cities were renamed to change names given after British Rulers to their original or native names, or to names more acceptable to the local population (for example, Montgomery was renamed to its old original name Sahiwal), Toba Tek Singh remained one of the very few cities to maintain its original name mainly because of noble reputation of Tek Singh. In 1982, Toba Tek Singh, formerly a subdivision, was separated from Faisalabad District and became a separate district.

in 1970, the historical Kisan Conference saw 200,000 Kisans (peasants) and progressive people from the whole country gathered in Toba Tek Singh. The conference had a great impact on the political history of Pakistan and led to the land reforms during the regime of Zulfiqar Ali Bhutto.

Demography 

Toba Tek Singh is located in central Punjab and occupies 3252 square kilometers and is made up of large areas of lowlands that flood frequently during the rainy season; the floods originate from the Ravi River that runs along the southern and southeastern borders. During the British Raj, Toba Tek Singh had a small Sikh population, much of which migrated to India after the partition in 1947, while many Muslim refugees from modern-day India settled in the Toba Tek Singh District.

At the time of the 2017 census the district had a population of 2,191,495, of which 1,100,365 were males and 1,090,879 females. Rural population is 1,749,524 while the urban population is 441,971. The literacy rate was 67.32%. Muslims were the predominant religious community with 96.83% of the population while Christians were 3.05% of the population.

At the time of the 2017 census, 97.86% of the population spoke Punjabi and 1.03% Urdu as their first language.

Toba Tek Singh People
As per University of Agriculture, Faisalabad research, after Karachi, Toba Tek Singh is the second hub of poultry products in Pakistan. Farmers grow orange (kinoo) gardens and have a major role in the export of oranges from Pakistan.
Many Toba people are overseas Pakistanis and these make a major contribution to the Pakistani economy.

Administration 
The district of Toba Tek Singh is administratively subdivided into four tehsils and 82 Union Council.

The district is represented in the National Assembly by three elected MNAs who represent the following constituencies:

The district is represented in the provincial assembly by seven elected MPAs who represent the following constituencies:

Until the year 2000, when the Divisions of Pakistan were abolished, Toba Tek Singh and Jhang districts were part of Faisalabad Division (this included Faisalabad District).

Major towns in Toba Tek Singh District are:

 Pir Mahal
 Gojra
 Kamalia
 Rajana
 Sandhilianwali
 Mongi Bangla
 Nawan Lahore

Notable people
Chaudray Muhammad Abdul Sattar MNA NA93, MPA PP86, District Chairperson and Owner of Sultan Group ltd.
Muhammad Hazma MNA NA-92 PMLN and Member Senate of Pakistan. 
Amjad Javed Saleemi Ex-Inspector General, Punjab Police (October 2018 to April 2019).
Riaz Fatyana MNA (PTI) NA-113 Chairman Standing Committee on Law and Justice, Member Public Accounts Committee, Convener SDG's, Member NACTA EX Minister for Education, Finance and Information, Punjab.
Muhammad Junaid Anwar Chaudhry MNA NA112-NA93, Minister Postal and Communication Services (2017-18), Member Public Accounts Committee.
The Governor of Punjab, Chaudhry Mohammad Sarwar (2013 – 2018 )(2018 – 2023), Member of Parliament (United Kingdom), Chairman of Sarwar Foundation.
Ashifa Riaz Fatyana MPA (PTI) (Minister for Women's development), Punjab
Ehsan Riaz Fatyana MPA PP-58 (Independent).
Ijaz ul Haq EX-MNA (son of former President of Pakistan, Zia ul Haq)
Asad Ur Rehman EX- MNA (PML-N).
Nazia Raheel EX-MPA (PMLN).
Khalid Ahmed Khan Kharal EX-MNA (PPPP).
Waheed Akbar Chaudray Entrepreneur and Founder Member PTI, District President TT.Singh, Member National Council of PTI.
Chaudray Amjad Ali Warrich Ex-Minister Mines and Mineral.
Fauzia Warrich District Chairperson TTSingh member PMLN.
Chaudray Amjad javeed X-MPA PP-86 PMLN, District Presiden PMLN.
Chaudray Saeed Ahmed Saeedi Newly elected member MPA-PP121.
Col retd Sardar Ayub khan MPA PP 120 General Secatory PMLN.
Shafqat Rasool Pakistan Hockey Team player.

References

External links
Toba Tek Singh profile on Punjab's government website

 
Districts of Punjab, Pakistan